Die Another Day is the soundtrack for the 20th James Bond film of the same name, and was released by Warner Bros. Records on November 12, 2002.

Arnold made use of electronic rhythm elements in his score, and included two of the new themes he created for The World Is Not Enough. The first, originally used as Renard's theme for the previous film, is heard during the mammoth "Antonov" cue on the recording, and is written for piano. The second new theme, most easily described as Bond's romance theme, is heard here on the "Going Down Together" track. There is also a second romance theme in "Die Another Day" which was previously used on The World Is Not Enough soundtrack titled "Christmas in Turkey", and can be heard during the Moneypenny/Bond virtual sequence.

In November 2017, La La Land Records released a limited expanded edition containing previously unreleased music.

The album received mixed to negative reviews.

Track listing 
 "Die Another Day" – Performed by Madonna
 "James Bond Theme (Bond vs. Oakenfold)" – David Arnold featuring Paul Oakenfold
 "On the Beach"
 "Hovercraft Chase"
 "Some Kind of Hero?"
 "Welcome to Cuba"
 "Jinx Jordan"
 "Jinx and James"
 "A Touch of Frost"
 "Icarus"
 "Laser Fight"
 "Whiteout"
 "Iced Inc."
 "Antonov"
 "Going Down Together"

Expanded edition 

Disc 1

 On the Beach (extended version)** 3:56
 Bond Meets Moon*/Hovercrafts* 2:16
 How Do You Intend to Kill Me Now, Mr. Bond?* 2:02
 Hovercraft Chase 3:48
 Bond to Jail* 0:49
 Some Kind of Hero? 4:32
 Kiss of Life* 4:46
 Peaceful Fountains of Desire* 1:05
 What's In it For You?*/Cuba* 1:21
 Cuban Car* 0:50
 Jinx Jordan 1:28
 Jinx & James 2:03
 Wheelchair Access* 2:22
 Jinx, James and Genes* 5:14
 Gustav Graves’ Grand Entrance* 1:34
 Blades* 3:12
 Bond Gets the Key*/Virtual Reality* 2:01
 The Vanish*/Bond Goes to Iceland* 2:10
 The Explanation* 1:36
 Icarus 1:23
 Ice Spy* 3:00
 A Touch of Frost 1:50
 Laser Fight 4:36
 It Belongs to His Boss*/Double Agent* 2:34
 Whiteout 4:55
 Bond Kidnaps Skidoo* 2:29
 Iced Inc. 3:08
 Ice Palace Car Chase* 4:57

Disc 2

 Switchblades* 3:23
 Antonov 11:51
 Antonov Gets It* 3:20
 Moneypenny Gets It* 1:11
 Going Down Together 1:32

Additional Music

 On the Beach 2:50
 Hovercraft Chase (film version)** 3:47
 Some Kind of Hero? (film version)** 4:32
 Peaceful Fountains of Desire (alternate ending)* 1:06
 What's In it For You? (orchestra only)* 0:41
 Welcome to Cuba 2:07
 Jinx Jordan (orchestra only)** 1:28
 Jinx & James (film version)** 2:07
 Wheelchair Access (original version)* 2:22
 Party Trick (source)* 1:37
 A Touch of Frost (film version)** 1:50
 Laser Fight (film version)** 4:38
 Whiteout (full mix)** 4:55
 Antonov (film version)** 11:51
 James Bond Will Return* 3:54

(*) Previously unreleased
(**) Contains previously unreleased material

In popular culture 
 South Korean figure skater Kim Yuna used the track "Going Down Together" as part of her James Bond Medley short program for the 2009–2010 season. The James Bond Medley program was also used at the 2010 Winter Olympics in Vancouver, Canada, where Kim went on to win a gold medal.

See also 
 James Bond music
 Outline of James Bond

Certifications

References

External links 
 Soundtrack.net

Soundtrack albums from James Bond films
Soundtrack
David Arnold soundtracks
2002 soundtrack albums
Warner Records soundtracks
Albums produced by Madonna